Jingyu, jing-yu, or variation, may refer to:

Places
Jingyu County (Jingyu County), in Jilin Province, China
Jingyu, Jingyu County (Jingyu Town), county seat of Jingyu County
Jingyu Subdistrict, Daowai District, Harbin, China (Jingyu Subdistrict)

People
Yang Jingyu (1905-1940), Chinese Communist general

See also

 Jing (disambiguation)
 Yu (disambiguation)
Yujing (disambiguation)